On 13 May 2014, blasting at Eynez coal mine in Soma, Manisa, Turkey, caused an underground mine fire, which burned until 15 May. In total, 301 people were killed in what was the worst mine disaster in Turkey's history. The mine, operated by coal producer Soma Kömür İşletmeleri A.Ş., suffered a fire, the causes of which were later found to be complex. The fire occurred at the mine's shift change, and 787 workers were underground at the time. At the time the disaster was thought to be mainly an explosion rather than fire. After the final bodies were pulled from the mine on 17 May 2014, four days after the fire, the Minister of Energy and Natural Resources Taner Yıldız confirmed the number of dead was 301. Disaster and Emergency Management Presidency (AFAD) announced the names of 301 workers who died in the mine disaster and 486 people who survived. 

Miners protested against dangerous mining conditions in late 2013 and the demand by the main opposition party, the Republican People's Party, to investigate the mine's safety was rejected in the Grand National Assembly of Turkey with votes from the ruling Justice and Development Party only weeks before the disaster.

An official expert report was published in 2016 which found several causes of the disaster, including inadequate official inspections.

Background

Mining accidents are common in Turkey, which has poor mine-safety conditions. According to a report issued in 2010 by the Turkish Economy Policies Research Foundation (TEPAV), in 2008, deaths per 1 million tons of coal mined were 7.22 in Turkey (the highest figure in the world), 5 times the rate in China (1.27) and 361 times the rate in the US (0.02). Official statistics record that more than 3,000 coal miners died in mining accidents from 1941 to April 2014. 78 miners were killed in accidents in 2012, and 95 died in 2013. Prior to the Soma disaster, the deadliest accident in recent Turkish mining history was an explosion which killed 263 people in 1992.

The mine, formerly a state-owned company, had been privatized in 2005. In 2012 Alp Gürkan, CEO of Soma Holding, indicated that since privatization the cost of producing coal had decreased from about $140 to $24 per ton.

In November 2013 hundreds of coal miners protested against working conditions by barricading themselves in a mine in Zonguldak.

On 29 April 2014, the Republican People's Party's demand for a parliamentary investigation regarding the safety in Soma mines was rejected by the Grand National Assembly.

Fire 
The fire killed 301 workers, mostly from carbon monoxide poisoning. Because the fire took place close to shift change, the exact number of employees underground at the time was initially uncertain.

Rescue effort 

Rescue crews arrived at the mine soon after the explosion and provided fresh air to the mine workings in an effort to keep those workers still trapped underground alive. Four mine rescue teams were deployed underground to look for trapped miners; however, thick smoke initially hindered progress in the operations to rescue more workers from the mine.

Reactions

Domestic 
 The Turkish government announced three days of national mourning for the Soma coal mining victims.
 Presidency of Religious Affairs announces that prayer will be held for Soma on following Friday in all mosques in Turkey.
 Youth week activities scheduled to take place on 19 May at the festival was canceled by Ministry of Youth and Sports.
 The Turkish Football Federation (TFF) announces that competitions in all amateur and professional leagues scheduled to play on 14 and 15 May have been postponed to a later date.
 Soma Kömür İşletmeleri A.Ş., the mine owner, replaced its website with a black page, a message of condolences for those affected by the fire.
 Regarding the mining disaster, investigation was initiated by the Office of the Prosecutor in Manisa.
 Around 800 protesters hurled stones at the police and shouted anti-government slogans as they tried to march from Middle East Technical University (METU) to the Ministry of Energy and Natural Resources building in Ankara. Hundreds of demonstrators also gathered outside the headquarters of the company which owns the mine, Soma Holding, in Istanbul. Some had sprayed "Murderers" on the walls. During protests in Soma, Prime Minister Recep Tayyip Erdoğan appeared to push a man while PM Erdoğan's aide Yusuf Yerkel was seen kicking a protester lying on the ground. Yerkel later took a sick leave with soft tissue trauma in his right leg.
 Hundreds of family members in the town of Soma, Manisa ( from the mine) surrounded and attacked Prime Minister Erdoğan's car after he stated the mine deaths were "normal". Afterwards they chased him through the city, at which point he had to flee to a shop, while rocks were thrown and people shouted "murderer" and "thief."
 KESK, one of the principal trade union confederations in Turkey, called for a one-day general strike for Thursday, 15 May, citing privatisation as the cause of the disaster.
 Thousands of protestors also gathered in Artvin, Bursa, Edirne, Eskişehir, Giresun, İzmir, Kırklareli, Kocaeli, Muğla, and Tekirdağ. All of the protests have been repelled by police teams with tear gas and water cannons.
 The Anadolu news agency reported that four persons have been arrested, including the Soma Coal Mining Company's operating manager Akin Celik. Twenty-five people were also detained and questioned.

International 
 Armenia – Armenian President Serzh Sargsyan offered condolences to the president of Turkey Abdullah Gul, the victims' families and wished quick recovery to the injured miners.
 Azerbaijan – Azerbaijani President Ilham Aliyev expressed his condolences to the Turkish people and announced one day of national mourning over the tragedy.
 Egypt – Egyptian President Adly Mansour mourned the hundreds killed in the accident and offered condolences to President Abdullah Gul and the people of Turkey as well as the families of the victims, according to a presidential statement. In another statement, Egypt's foreign ministry offered condolences for the deaths. "We express our sincerest condolences to the sister state of Turkey, its friendly people and the families of the victims," Egyptian FM spokesman Badr Abdel-Ati said in the statement.
 Greece – Greek Deputy Prime Minister and Foreign Minister Evangelos Venizelos contacted his counterpart Ahmet Davutoglu to express the "deep condolences of Greek people at the tragic mine disaster," a Greek Foreign Ministry statement said. In addition, the Greek official expressed his country's readiness to offer any aid to the ongoing rescue operations to free workers still trapped in the mine.
 Holy See – Pope Francis made an appeal for prayer for the miners who died in the Soma mining disaster.
 India – Indian President Pranab Mukherjee expressed condolences to Turkish President Abdullah Gül. He condoled the loss of lives in Turkey's coal mine disaster and said that India stands by the people of Turkey in this difficult hour.
 Israel – The Israeli consulate in Istanbul expressed sympathy, saying they "bow their heads in sorrow at the tragic loss of life". Israel offered Turkey any assistance as required.
Morocco – The king of Morocco, Mohammed VI, addressed a condolence message to the Turkish president Abdullah Gül, and through him, to the Turkish nation and the families of victims.
 Northern Cyprus – The Turkish Republic of Northern Cyprus declared two days of national mourning over the Soma disaster.
 Pakistan – Pakistan announced one day of national mourning over the tragedy.
 Russia – Russian President Vladimir Putin expressed his condolences to those who died in the mines.
United Kingdom – Queen Elizabeth II and Prince Philip expressed their condolences. British Ambassador to Turkey Richard Moore expressed his condolences.
 United States – U.S. President Barack Obama expressed his condolences, saying "We share the grief of the Turkish people". U.S. Ambassador to Turkey Francis Ricciardone and U.S. President Obama's National Security Council (NSC) also offered condolences on behalf of the American people.

International organizations 
 European Union – EU Enlargement Commissioner Štefan Füle and Council of Europe Secretary General Thorbjørn Jagland issued messages to express their condolences.

Others 
A black ribbon with a notice that read "condolences to all of us" was placed on the Turkish Google homepage on 14 and 15 May.

Football clubs Beşiktaş, Fenerbahçe, Galatasaray and Trabzonspor from Turkey, Chelsea, Liverpool, Manchester City, and Sheffield United from England, Atlético Madrid and Barcelona from Spain, Borussia Dortmund and Schalke 04 from Germany, Porto from Portugal, and Persepolis from Iran published messages of condolence about the disaster. Beşiktaş announced that all revenue of the match to be played the following weekend would be donated to the needy in Soma. Galatasaray and Atlético Madrid played a friendly match in İzmir, as did Sheffield United and Fenerbahçe at Bramall Lane, with income donated to the victims' relatives. Fenerbahçe announced that they would offer one hundred scholarships for five years to children in Soma.

Investigations 
An official expert report was prepared by 8 academics and an electrical engineer and published in 2016. Four other expert reports were published. 

Shortly after 2 p.m. on the day of the disaster the heaved floor of the main road was deliberately blasted for the conveyor belt. Soon after this blasting, a roof fall occurred and a fire started in the roof near the blasting point. The fire ignited some wooden pieces used to fix steel sets. With the help of methane, the upper part of the conveyor belt also caught fire. The ventilation system short circuited near the fire.

Many recommendations for improving safety were made both by official reports and others, including better inspections, better communication and alarm systems, and more planning for emergencies.

37 people were acquitted in a trial which ended in 2018, and 14 were found guilty of causing death and injury by negligence, some of whom served up to seven years in prison.

Further reading 
 Expert Report (in Turkish)

See also 

 List of mining disasters

References 

2014 fires in Asia
2014 in Turkey
2014 mining disasters
Coal mining disasters in Turkey
Explosions in 2014
Fires in Turkey
History of Manisa Province
May 2014 events in Turkey
Soma District
2014 disasters in Turkey